Everitt W. Moore was an English professional footballer who played as a forward.

Career
Moore joined Bradford City from Rawdon in June 1903. He made 3 league appearances for the club. He was released by the club in 1904.

Sources

References

Date of birth missing
Date of death missing
English footballers
Bradford City A.F.C. players
English Football League players
Association football forwards